Fadia Omrani (born 27 February 1984) is a Tunisian handball player for Club Africain and the Tunisian national team.

She represented Tunisia at the 2013 World Women's Handball Championship in Serbia.

References

Tunisian female handball players
1984 births
Living people
Mediterranean Games competitors for Tunisia
Competitors at the 2022 Mediterranean Games
20th-century Tunisian women
21st-century Tunisian women